Bastien Fuster (born 21 January 1992) is a French professional rugby union player. He plays at wing for Rouen Normandie in the Pro D2. He is international with the Spain national rugby union team.

References

External links
Ligue Nationale De Rugby Profile
European Professional Club Rugby Profile
Bayonne Profile

Living people
1992 births
French rugby union players
Aviron Bayonnais players
Rugby union wings